Lucius Fairchild (December 27, 1831May 23, 1896) was an American politician, soldier, and diplomat. He served as the tenth Governor of Wisconsin and represented the United States as Minister to Spain under presidents Rutherford B. Hayes and James A. Garfield.  He served as a Union Army colonel during the American Civil War and lost an arm at Gettysburg.

Military career

In 1858, with the American Civil War looming, Fairchild volunteered as a private with the Wisconsin militia company known as the "Governor's Guard".  At the outbreak of the war in 1861, the Governor's Guard was accepted into federal service as Company K of the 1st Wisconsin Infantry Regiment.  With the 1st Wisconsin Infantry, he served at the Battle of Hoke's Run against the "Stonewall Brigade" of General Thomas J. Jackson.

In August 1861, the enlistments of the 1st Wisconsin Infantry expired and Fairchild was appointed captain in the 16th U.S. Infantry as well as major of the 2nd Wisconsin Volunteer Infantry Regiment.  The 2nd Wisconsin served in the brigade commanded by General William T. Sherman until the general reorganization of the Union army following the First Battle of Bull Run.  Electing to stay with the 2nd Wisconsin Infantry, Fairchild was soon commissioned lieutenant colonel and, with his regiment now a part of the famed Iron Brigade within the Army of the Potomac, participated in the Second Battle of Bull Run. One week thereafter, on September 8, 1862, he was promoted to the rank of colonel of the 2nd Wisconsin Infantry.  On February 27, 1863, the Iron Brigade, now under the command of Brig. Gen. Solomon Meredith, was re-designated the "1st Brigade, 1st Division, I Corps", which gave Fairchild the distinction of being the ranking officer among all commissioned officers within the I Corps of the Army of the Potomac during the Spring and Summer of 1863.

Fairchild and the 2nd Wisconsin Infantry distinguished themselves at the Battle of Antietam, and then again at Seminary Ridge during the first day of fighting at the Battle of Gettysburg on July 1, 1863, being the first infantry regiment to make close contact with the Confederate Army.  During the engagement, at approximately 10:00, the 2nd Wisconsin Infantry delivered a striking blow by capturing very first Confederate general officer of the war, Brig. Gen. James J. Archer. Almost immediately after this success, the regiment was ambushed by an attack on their right flank, losing seventy-seven percent of their ranks, including most officers. Fairchild was shot in the upper arm, captured, tended to, and released. While recovering from his amputated left arm, Fairchild was commissioned as a brigadier general by President Abraham Lincoln on October 19, 1863.

Political and diplomatic career
Fairchild resigned from the military in November 1863 and was appointed Secretary of State of Wisconsin (1864–1866), before being elected three term Governor of Wisconsin (1866–1872). After his time as governor, Fairchild was appointed U.S. consul at Liverpool (1871) and then consul general at Paris (1880–1881), Fairchild was Envoy Extraordinary and Minister Plenipotentiary to Spain.

Fairchild later served as Commander-in-Chief of the Grand Army of the Republic (1886–1887) and of the Military Order of the Loyal Legion of the United States (1893–1895); during the former of these terms, he came to national prominence for calling upon God to "palsy" President Grover Cleveland for offering to return several captured Confederate battle flags to the veterans of their respective regiments as a peace gesture towards the South. He was also a member of the Society of the Army of the Potomac.  Fairchild also received 95 degrees in the Masonic Order "Egyptian Masonic Rite of Memphis". He died in Madison, Wisconsin in May 1896.

Fairchild was also known as an outspoken "Radical Republican", he fervently supported civil rights for blacks and vehemently opposed Rutherford B. Hayes for "appeasing" southern segregationists in what he referred to as "the second civil war". He believed Reconstruction ended too early, and on terms he described as "cowardly" and "disgraceful". He supported Wisconsin Senator Timothy O. Howe in pushing for more severe measures in the South that would guarantee civil rights by force.

Family

Lucius Fairchild was of entirely English ancestry.  His family tree can be traced through three large migrations.  Firstly all of his ancestors migrated from England to New England during the Puritan migration to New England during the early colonial period, between 1620 and 1640.  In the immediate aftermath of the American Revolution all of Fairchild's ancestors moved from New England to the region of upstate New York, and only one generation after that, following the Northwest Indian War they moved to the northern part of Ohio.  Fairchild had a grandfather and a great-grandfather who fought in the American Revolution.

Fairchild is a descendant of Thomas Fairchild who emigrated to North America in 1639. His parents were Sally (Blair) and Jairus C. Fairchild, who was the first State Treasurer of Wisconsin and the first Mayor of the city of Madison, Wisconsin. His brother, Cassius Fairchild, served as Democratic Party Leader in the Wisconsin State Assembly, and also served in the Union Army during the American Civil War with the rank of colonel (and brevet brigadier general). His brother Charles served in the Union Navy during the war. His wife was Frances Bull Fairchild, and together they had three daughters: Mary, Sarah, and Caryl.

Legacy
The town of Fairchild, Wisconsin and the  Liberty ship SS Lucius Fairchild, built in 1943 in Portland, Oregon for the United States War Shipping Administration, were named in his honor, as was Mount Fairchild (13,502'), a prominent peak located in Rocky Mountain National Park, Colorado. In Kent, Ohio, where Fairchild was born in 1831, Fairchild Avenue is named after him. Fairchild visited Kent with much fanfare in 1887 and the road was officially named for him in 1904.  A John Singer Sargent portrait of General Fairchild is housed at the Wisconsin Historical Museum located in Madison, Wisconsin.

Electoral history

| colspan="6" style="text-align:center;background-color: #e9e9e9;"| General Election, November 7, 1865

| colspan="6" style="text-align:center;background-color: #e9e9e9;"| General Election, November 5, 1867

| colspan="6" style="text-align:center;background-color: #e9e9e9;"| General Election, November 2, 1869

See also

Fairchild family
List of American Civil War generals (Union)
List of U.S. political families-Fairchild
Ellen Southard

Bibliography
 Gilmore, Jean Fairchild. Early Fairchilds in America and Their Descendants. Baltimore, MD: Gateway Press, 1991.
 Ross, Sam. The Empty Sleeve: A Biography of Lucius Fairchild.  Madison, WI: State Historical Society of Wisconsin, 1964.

Notes

External links

Union Army generals
Republican Party governors of Wisconsin
19th-century American diplomats
Ambassadors of the United States to Spain
People from Kent, Ohio
American Civil War prisoners of war
Military personnel from Wisconsin
People of Wisconsin in the American Civil War
Iron Brigade
American amputees
Lucius
1831 births
1896 deaths
Secretaries of State of Wisconsin
American politicians with disabilities
American Protestants
Grand Army of the Republic Commanders-in-Chief
19th-century American politicians
Burials in Wisconsin